Lucien Abenhaim (born 1951 in Casablanca) is a pharmacoepidemiologist and an expert in public health. He focuses on the impact of numerous drugs on populations and risks associated with work. He is recognised as one of the greatest French General Director of Health (Surgeon General).

Education and positions
He holds an MD from the University of Paris (1977), an MSc from McGill University and a PhD from the Ecole des Hautes Etudes en Sciences Sociales in Paris (Information, Risk and Decision, 1986). He is a Professor of Public Health at the University of Paris 5 (2003–present) and an Honorary Professor of Epidemiology at the London School of Hygiene and Tropical Medicine (2005–present). He has previously taught as a Full Professor of Epidemiology and Biostatistics at McGill University (1989–1999). He held the position of General Director of Health of France (1999–2003). In this later capacity he oversaw the public health of the country and participated in European regulatory decisions. He also was an elected Member of the Executive Committee of the World Health Organization (2002–2003).

Lucien Abenhaim is the father of Forbes 30 Under 30 recipient Felix LaHaye.

Work

Abenhaim has written numerous academic papers throughout his career, one of the most influential being "Appetite-Suppressant Drugs and the Risk of Primary Pulmonary Hypertension" that he wrote in 1996. In 2003 he published a book entitled "Canicules" in which he describes the French health system and its inefficiency in solving numerous problems. This book was written after he had resigned his post General Director of Health in protest over his minister's alleged inappropriate efforts to reassure the public and minimize the seriousness of last August's heat wave.

References

French epidemiologists
Living people
1951 births